There are many collegiate secret societies in North America. They vary greatly in their level of secrecy and the degree of independence from their universities. A collegiate secret society makes a significant effort to keep affairs, membership rolls, signs of recognition, initiation, or other aspects secret from the public.

Some collegiate secret societies are referred to as "class societies", which restrict membership to one class year. Most class societies are restricted to the senior class and are therefore also called senior societies on many campuses.

Categorization
There is no strict rule on the categorization of secret societies. Secret societies can have ceremonial initiations, secret signs of recognition (gestures, handshakes, passwords), formal secrets, (the 'true' name of the society, a motto, or society history); but, college fraternities or "social fraternities" have the same, and some of these elements can also be a part of literary societies, singing groups, editorial boards, and honorary and pre-professional groups. Some secret societies have kept their membership secret, for example Seven Society and Gridiron, and some have not, like Skull and Bones (the Yale societies had published their membership lists in the yearbooks and the Yale Daily News).

One key concept in distinguishing secret societies from fraternities is that, on campuses that have both kinds of organizations, one can be a member of both (that is, membership is not mutually exclusive). Usually, being a member of more than one fraternity is not considered appropriate, because that member would have divided loyalties; however, typically, there is no issue with being a member of a secret society and a fraternity, because they are not considered similar organizations or competing organizations.

An especially difficult problem is the degree to which any one society is an actual society or is simply an honorary designation. Phi Beta Kappa, for example, was a true secret society, but after its secrets were divulged, the society continued. It claims today to still be an actual society that has meetings, conducts its affairs, and is a living social entity. For most members, membership consists of one evening's initiation, and no more, which would make the society completely an honorary one in most people's eyes.

Many secret societies exist as honoraries on one campus and may have been actual meeting societies at one time, kept alive by one or two dedicated local alumni or an alumni affairs or Dean's office person, who see to it that an annual initiation is held every year. Some of these state that they are honoraries; others seek to perpetuate the image of a continuing active society where there is none.

While there are some guideline criteria for the neutral observer to understand what sort of society any given organization is, much of the analysis reverts to what any one society has been traditionally understood to be. There are additional means, such as societies that were more or less explicitly established in emulation of some previous secret society, or using historical records to show that society X was created out of society Y.

Common traits
There are several common traits among these societies. For example, many societies have two-part names, such as Skull and Bones or Scroll and Key. Many societies also limit their membership to a specific numerical limit in a class year. Extensive mortuary imagery is associated with many secret societies, maintaining a pretense of great seriousness, and clubhouses are often called "tombs".

Tapping
The archetypical selection process for entry into a collegiate secret society began at Yale University by a process called tapping. On a publicly announced evening, Yale undergraduates would assemble informally in the College Yard. Current members of Yale's secret societies would walk through the crowd and literally tap a prospective member on the shoulder and then walk with him up to the tapped man's dorm room. There, in private, they would ask him to become a member of their secret society; the inductee had the choice of accepting or rejecting the offer of membership. During this process, it was publicly known who was being tapped for the coming year. Today, the selection process is not quite as formal but is in some ways still public. Now, many societies slip seal-stamped letters under the doors of expecting Juniors, and send cryptic emails to students' inboxes, inviting them to rush parties. Formal tapping days used to exist at Berkeley, and still exist in a much more formal setting at Missouri.

Honoraries
Several campuses distinguish societies called "honoraries" from secret societies. An honorary is considered to operate in name only: membership is an honor given in recognition of some achievement, and such a society is distinct from a secret society. However, functionally, such organizations can operate identically to secret societies, and historically, most honoraries operated on a secret society basis. Phi Beta Kappa is the best-known such example, where it originally operated on a secret chapter basis, and it became the progenitor of all college fraternities, and at the same time, sometime after its secrets were made public in the 1830s, Phi Beta Kappa continued as an honorary. Virtually all the oldest honoraries were once clearly secret societies, and the extent to which they are distinct is now ambiguous at best.

History
The first collegiate secret society recorded in North America is that of the F.H.C. Society, established on November 11, 1750, at The College of William & Mary. Though the letters stand for a Latin phrase, the society is informally and publicly referred to as the "Flat Hat Club"; its most prominent members included St. George Tucker, Thomas Jefferson, and George Wythe. The second-oldest Latin-letter society, the P.D.A. Society ("Please Don't Ask"), in 1776 refused entry to John Heath, then a student at the college; rebuffed, he in the same year established the first Greek-letter secret society at the college, the Phi Beta Kappa, modeling it on the two older fraternities (see the Flat Hat Club). The Phi Beta Kappa society had a rudimentary initiation and maintained an uncertain level of secrecy. Those secrets were exposed in the mid-1830s by students at Harvard University acting under the patronage of John Quincy Adams. Since the 1840s, Phi Beta Kappa has operated openly as an academic honor society.

The spread of Phi Beta Kappa to different colleges and universities likely sparked the creation of such competing societies as Chi Phi (1824), Kappa Alpha Society (1825), and Sigma Phi Society (1827); many continue today as American collegiate social fraternities (and, later, sororities). Sigma Phi remains the oldest continuously operating national collegiate secret society; it may have declined the founding members of Skull & Bones a charter before they formed their society. A second line of development took place at Yale College, with the creation of Chi Delta Theta (1821) and Skull and Bones (1832): antecedents of what would become known as class societies.

Skull & Bones aroused competition on campus, bringing forth Scroll and Key (1841), and later Wolf's Head (1883), among students in the senior class. But the prestige of the senior societies was able to keep the very influential fraternities Alpha Delta Phi and Psi Upsilon from ever becoming full four-year institutions at Yale. They remained junior class societies there. There were sophomore and freshman societies at Yale as well. A stable system of eight class societies (two competing chains of four class societies each) was in place by the late 1840s.

Delta Kappa Epsilon is a highly successful junior class society, founded at Yale in 1844. None of the 51 chapters the parent chapter spawned operates as a junior society, but DKE did come from the class society system. Likewise, Alpha Sigma Phi started as a Yale sophomore society and now has 68 chapters (although, again, none of Alpha Sigma Phi's chapters have remained sophomore societies).

The development of class societies spread from Yale to other campuses in the northeastern States. Seniors at neighboring Wesleyan established a senior society, Skull & Serpent (1865), and a second society, originally a chapter of Skull and Bones, but then independent as a sophomore society, Theta Nu Epsilon (1870), which began to drastically increase the number of campuses with class societies. William Raimond Baird noted in the 1905 edition of his Manual that, "In addition to the regular fraternities, there are Eastern college societies which draw members from only one of the undergraduate classes, and which have only a few features of the general fraternity system." From Wesleyan, the practice spread more widely across the Northeast, with full systems soon in place at Brown, Rutgers, and other institutions.

Kappa Sigma Theta, Phi Theta Psi, Delta Beta Xi, Delta Sigma Phi, were all sophomore societies at Yale, and the two large freshman societies of Delta Kappa and Kappa Sigma Epsilon lived until 1880. Delta Kappa established chapters at Amherst College, the University of North Carolina, University of Virginia, University of Mississippi, Dartmouth College, and Centre College. Kappa Sigma Epsilon had chapters at Amherst, Rensselaer Polytechnic Institute and Dartmouth. Other class societies existed at Brown, Harvard, Syracuse, Colgate, Cornell, and other Northeastern institutions. At universities such as Colgate University, these secret societies have evolved and morphed over the years.

Theta Nu Epsilon spread to about 120 colleges and universities, but many of its chapters operated as three-year societies where a class-year society was inappropriate.

It is from this class society's historical base and the desire to emulate the best-known of all the class societies, Skull & Bones, that senior societies in particular began to spread nationally between 1900 and 1930. Junior, sophomore, and freshman class societies also are to be found at campuses across the country today.

Individual institutions

Clemson University
Tiger Brotherhood is an honorary service fraternity at Clemson University. It still embraces the same basic tenets as established by its founders, led by John Logan Marshall in 1929. Tiger Brotherhood promotes high standards of social and ethical conduct while recognizing in its members an earnest devotion to Clemson, coupled with the integrity of character commensurate with a typical Clemson gentleman. The organization embodies an unequaled cross-section representation of the Clemson community. Students, faculty, and staff all work with the bonds of brotherhood to champion a closer relationship. One for all and all for one, with Clemson and its many traditions and undying spirit as the central focus, today provides a viable, flexible, and continuing forum for ideas and unending service to Clemson. For 90 years it has remained surrounded by an air of mystery.

Colgate University

Since being founded in 1819, Colgate University has had a rich tradition of student societies. Over the years, Colgate has had numerous secret societies with various degrees of secrecy.

Although there have been many underground organizations on the Colgate campus, the first secret honor society on record is the Skull and Scroll society founded in 1908. Members of the Skull and Scroll wore white hats with a black skull and scroll added to them. The Skull and Scroll had a rich history of membership with important names in Colgate history such as Ellery Huntington, Melbourne Read, and Harold Whitnall. A rival organization, The Gorgon's Head, was founded in 1912 and had members that wore black hats with a golden emblem. The Gorgon's Head chose people for traits such as character, distinguished service, and achievement. These two organizations competed with each other until 1934 when they merged to create the Konosioni senior honor society, none of the Tredecim Senior Honor Society.

In its earlier iteration, the society initially was tasked with enforcing rules, such as mandating that all freshmen have to wear green beanies, with the punishment of paddling. The 1970s saw a change in course for the society as it became focused on leadership and the community. Tredecim now leads torch-light processions for first-year students during convocation and for seniors during graduation.

The College of William & Mary

The College of William & Mary in Williamsburg, Virginia, was home to the first known secret collegiate society in the United States, the F.H.C. Society (founded in 1750). The initials of the society stand for a Latin phrase, likely "Fraternitas, Humanitas, et Cognitio" or "Fraternitas Humanitas Cognitioque" (two renderings of "brotherhood, humaneness, and knowledge"), but it has long been publicly nicknamed the "Flat Hat Club". William & Mary alumnus and third American president, Thomas Jefferson, was perhaps the most famous member of the F.H.C. Society. Other notable members of the original society included Col. James Innes, St. George Tucker, and George Wythe. Jefferson noted, "When I was a student of Wm. & Mary college of this state, there existed a society called the F.H.C. society, confined to the number of six students only, of which I was a member, but it had no useful object, nor do I know whether it now exists."  The best opinion is that the society did not survive the British invasion of Virginia at the end of the American Revolution. The society was revived in 1916 (at first, as the Flat Hat Club) and revived again in 1972.

William & Mary students John Heath and William Short (Class of 1779) founded the nation's first collegiate Greek-letter organization, Phi Beta Kappa, on December 5, 1776, as a secret literary and philosophical society. Additional chapters were established in 1780 and 1781 at Yale and Harvard. With nearly 300 chapters across the country and no longer secret, Phi Beta Kappa has grown to become the nation's premier academic honor society. Alumni John Marshall and Bushrod Washington were two of the earliest members of the society, elected in 1778 and 1780, respectively.

Although the pressures of the American Civil War forced several societies to disappear, many were revived during the 20th century.  Some of the secret societies known to currently exist at the college are: The 7 Society, 13 Club, Alpha Club, Bishop James Madison Society, The Cord, Flat Hat Club, The Spades, W Society, and Wren Society.

Columbia University 
Columbia University has three secret societies: St. Anthony Hall (1847) and the Nacoms and Sachems (1898 and 1915, respectively). St. Anthony Hall is a fraternal organization and literary society founded at Columbia that has ten other chapters, notably at Yale, Princeton, and the University of Pennsylvania. The Nacoms and Sachems are senior societies of fifteen members each. Though efforts have been made by the university's student body to force them to abolish their secrecy and register with the administration, efforts have been unsuccessful.

Cornell University 
Cornell University has a rich history of secret societies on campus. Andrew Dickson White, the first President of Cornell University and himself a Bonesman, is said to have encouraged the formation of a "secret society" on campus. In the early years, the fraternities were called the "secret societies", but as the Greek system developed into a larger, more public entity, "secret society" began to refer only to the class societies, except for the Sigma Phi Society on campus. In the early twentieth century, Cornell students belonged to sophomore, junior, and senior societies, as well as honorary societies for particular fields of study. Liberalization of the 1960s spelled the end of these organizations as students rebelled against the establishment. The majority of the societies disappeared or became inactive in a very short period, and today, the four organizations which operate on campus are: Sphinx Head (founded in 1890), Der Hexenkreis (founded in 1892), Quill and Dagger (founded in 1893), and Order of Omega (founded in 1959).

Dartmouth College

Dartmouth College's Office of Residential Life states that the earliest senior societies on campus date to 1783 and "continue to be a vibrant tradition within the campus community". Six of the eight senior societies keep their membership secret, while the other societies maintain secretive elements. According to the college, "approximately 25% of the senior class members are affiliated with a senior society." The college's administration of the society system at Dartmouth focuses on keeping track of membership and tapping lists, and differs from that of Yale's, though there are historical parallels between the two colleges' societies.

Dickinson College
The Raven's Claw is an all-male senior honorary society at Dickinson College. It was founded in 1896, making it the first society unique to Dickinson College. Membership is limited to seven senior men who are selected by the seven previous members. The new members are chosen based on a variety of factors, these include campus leadership, a solid academic record, and athletic participation. New members are inducted through a "Tapping Ceremony" which is held on the "Old Stone Steps of Old West". The ceremony is traditionally conducted during the commencement weekend. They are called "claws" or "white hats", denoting the white caps they wear around campus to signify unity and loyalty. While the members of the group are known, the majority of their actions and traditions are concealed. The group prides itself in serving the Dickinson College and Carlisle, Pennsylvania communities through discreet service activities. The group's alumni organization is also responsible for founding one of the college's largest scholarship funds and the McAndrews Fund for athletics.

Founded in 2001, The Order of Scroll and Key is a senior honor society at Dickinson College that recognizes seven senior men each year. Every member is tapped at the end of their junior year based on their dedication to the college and the surrounding Carlisle community. Their current membership includes fraternity presidents, community advisers, community service leaders, as well as many other individuals. Their alumni have gone on to be successful community leaders, businessmen, artists, etc. The Order of Scroll and Key works to benefit numerous area charities and philanthropies, and in recent years has supported Carlisle C.A.R.E.S., Safe Harbor, and Sadler Health Clinic, among others. As one of Dickinson's distinctive "hat" societies, members can always be recognized by the gray hats that they wear.

Wheel and Chain is Dickinson College's Senior Women's Honorary Society. Founded in 1924, members are elected in the spring of their junior year based on participation in campus activities, service to the college and community, leadership skills, and personal character. Membership is limited to ten senior women. New members are inducted into a "Tapping Ceremony" which is held on the "Old Stone Steps of Old West" in April. In May, each incoming Wheel and Chain class ceremoniously rings the bell in Denny Hall during Commencement ceremonies. Colloquially known as the "blue hats", members are known to the public; however, the society's activities remain secret.

Duke University
Throughout its history, Duke University has hosted several secret societies. The Tombs is a now-defunct society founded in 1903 whose members were known to tie bells around their ankles. Details regarding its purpose, selection of members, and the importance of the bells are still unknown.

Two of the best-known societies were the Order of the Red Friars and the Order of the White Duchy. The Order of the Red Friars was founded in 1913 with the initial purpose to promote school spirit. Later, the group declared a change of mission to focus more on fostering loyalty to Duke University. The Order, as it was colloquially known, was semi-secret. This is because the selection of new members, known as tapping, was held on the steps of Duke Chapel in broad daylight. As the years went on, the rites of tapping became more elaborate; in the final and most traditional form of the rite, a red-hooded and robed figure publicly tapped new men into membership on the steps of the chapel. Some notable members of the Order were President Richard M. Nixon, William P. Few, and Rex Adams.

The Order of the White Duchy was founded in May 1925 by the Order of the Red Friars. The Red Friars chose what they considered the seven outstanding female members of the Class of 1925 to organize a similar organization, although it was not to be a sister organization. From 1925 on, new members were tapped into the order by the seven members of the White Duchy from the previous year. Members were known by the white carnation they wore on specific days of the year.

Throughout the 1960s, both societies faced charges of elitism and struggled to tap students at an increasingly hostile university. In 1968, the White Duchy disbanded, and in 1971, the Order of the Red Friars was disbanded by alumni who determined that the group had outlived its usefulness. However, rumors surrounding its continued, albeit modified, form exist today. Two current secret societies - the Trident Society and the Old Trinity Club - are both thought to have been founded in the wake of the disbanding of the Order of the Red Friars. The Old Trinity Club is rumored to have started when an Editor-in-Chief of the Duke Chronicle was passed up for membership and decided to create his own, rival society.

The Old Trinity Club is the most visible society on campus today, as its members are seen walking around campus wearing black graduation gowns and sunglasses on certain days of the year. They follow a set pattern, holding their arms in symbols in the air and routinely stopping and shouting "Eruditio et Religio." A November 2007 edition of Rival Magazine quoted Associate Vice President for Student Affairs and Dean of Students, Sue Wasiolek T'r76, claiming that "the Old Trinity Club has died, or at least in terms of its original manifestation. The way it manifests today is very different than when it was at its finest." It is said that students do not take the society seriously, viewing it more as a social fraternity than a secret society.

For years, there were rumors of a "TS" on campus as a continuation of the Order of the Red Friars' original mission. Only recently has it come to light that "TS" stands for "Trident Society". This society keeps the strictest silence about its membership and mission except for two instances when its existence came to be known. The first, in the November 2007 edition of the Rival Magazine, explained its ideas. According to a "cryptic letter sealed with wax", the society is "rooted in ideals that stretch back to the university's founding". The letter continued: "Our founders recognized that similar institutions existed at other top universities (Skull and Bones at Yale, The Sevens at UVA, Quill and Dagger at Cornell) and saw a void to fill at Duke".

As such, its members are not well-known on campus. They "do not join to gain fame" or recognition; that said, members of the society are or were Rhodes Scholars, commencement speakers, players for Coach Krzyzweski, Phi Beta Kappas, A.B. & B.N. Duke Scholars, and leaders of the most influential groups on campus. The secrecy around this group drove Samantha Lachman to investigate the society in 2013. Her subsequent article, "Trasked with Secrecy", revealed many of the secrets of the group. She discovered the names of several prominent members, that the red roses & white carnations sometimes found at the base of the James B. Duke statue on West Campus are their calling card, and even that they have uninhibited access to the Duke University Chapel for their Initiation Rites.

Emory University
Founded in 1836, Emory University is a prominent research institution in the city of Atlanta, GA.  Emory has five secret societies, including the Paladin Society, D.V.S. Senior Honor Society, Ducemus, Speculum, and The Order of Ammon.

In 2021, Ducemus was accused of attempting to manipulate Emory's student government elections by a member of its legislature, which led to a trial presided by the student judicial council. The accusatory plaintiff claimed that members of the secret society, who allegedly held positions in student government and various student organizations, attempted to sway the elections in their favor and secure positions for their members. The student judicial council ruled in the plaintiff's favor and disqualified the allegedly Ducemus-backed candidates.

Florida State University
The Burning Spear Society is a secret society at Florida State University, founded in 1993. Burning Spear was founded on July 14, 1993, by three students initially to promote Charlie Ward's Heisman campaign. By August 1993, sixteen students joined together to charter this new organization, and within one year, seven additional students were initiated into membership. Though not much is publicly available on the dealings of the organization, members often cite the provision of political, professional, and financial support of FSU community members and efforts that strengthen the university's traditions as two of their most basic ambitions.

Fordham University
Fordham University was long accused of being involved with secret societies and covert activities due to anti-Catholic and nativist sentiments against the Irish and Italian immigrants it historically served. John Kelly, successor to Boss Tweed as Grand Sachem of Tammany Hall, was the nephew-in-law of Cardinal John McCloskey, the first president of Fordham, and many Fordham students and alumni were involved with Tammany Hall, including Edward Flynn, 20th-century chair of the Democratic National Committee.

Fr. Leo McLaughlin S.J. founded the Fordham Club in 1954. Membership is reserved to about thirty members of the Fordham College at Rose Hill senior class "recommended by their prominence and influence in extracurricular endeavors during their first three college years, having contributed in a significant and preeminent way to the vibrant spirit of Fordham." They have a robust alumni network with regular reunions and influence in the University.

Founded in 1837, the Parthenian Sodality was transferred to Fordham, which was founded in 1841, from St. Mary's College in Kentucky when the Jesuits took over the administration of Fordham from the Archdiocese of New York in 1846. Approval of the transfer was granted by the Roman Prima Primaria in 1847. The Roman Sodality, under whose guidance the Parthenian Sodality was, was first founded in Rome in 1584. Though no longer held to the Roman sodality after Vatican II, the organization is said to exist in some form to this day under the name The Second Sodality, at which point it transitioned to being more identifiable as a secret society: hiding membership, meeting at odd times, and communicating through codes and riddles. The chapel atop the administration building, now known as Cunniffe House, listed over a hundred years of members, but this practice was ended around when the sodality went covert. It is said they will leave clues in the form of sonnets around campus and in the student newspapers to attract members. They tap around 25 members per year, of whom half usually figure out the clues. Meetings are usually held in the various chapels around campus, with important ceremonies happening in the Chapel of Our Lady of Sorrows.

There is also evidence of a group known as the "Legion of Hidden Loyalty" operating in the 1930s and 40s but no evidence of its proceedings or continued existence.

Furman University
Founded in 1826, Furman University is one of the oldest institutions of higher learning in South Carolina. Until 1992 the university was, to varying degrees affiliated with the Southern Baptist Convention which banned social organizations of all kinds. This drove students to seek such groups underground.

The most notable of these early secret societies was called "The Star and Lamp". It is known today on more than 100 campuses as Pi Kappa Phi Fraternity. Founded at The College of Charleston in 1904, Pi Kappa Phi operated "sub-rosa", or under the rose of secrecy, for much of the twentieth century to hide their activities from the university's Baptist administrators. During this time Sigma Alpha Epsilon and Tau Kappa Epsilon operated respectively as "The Centaur" and "The Knights Eternal" while a fourth organization, "The Robert E. Lee Fraternity" was concurrently active which would go on to merge with today's Kappa Alpha Order. For this reason, Pi Kappa Phi Fraternity's official flower is today, the rose, their sweetheart is called the rose and one of the group's most cherished songs is "The Rose Song". The rose and "sub-rosa" concepts are present in the group's esoteric literature and rituals. Furthermore, the fraternity's chapter at Furman carries a unique flag that bears a red rose in the upper right-hand corner.

On campus today the only known active secret society is The Quaternion Club, although many are rumored to exist. Quaternion, which dates back to 1903, taps four juniors and four seniors each year in the late winter or early spring. The selection process is guarded but is thought to be controlled by current Quaternions currently in residence at the school. The initiation ritual and all group meetings take place in the "Old College", the original building in which James C. Furman taught the university's first courses in Greenville in 1851. It is also widely known that Quaternions are given lifetime access to this building upon initiation which also houses the controls for the 59 bell Burnside Carillon inside Furman's iconic bell tower. Famous Quaternions have included U.S. Secretary of Education Richard Riley, South Carolina Governor Mark Sanford, and Clement Haynsworth, a nominee for the U.S. Supreme Court.

There are also several strongly rumored secret societies with less documentation including The Magnolia Society, which has formed within the past decade and taps men and women from all classes into something like an elitist supper club. Magnolians, as they are called, can be identified only on their way to or from a "happening" by the sweetgrass rose they wear on their breast. The Black Swan or Paladin Brotherhood was a darker organization rumored to have operated on and off from the late 1940s to the mid-1980s, utilizing the unfinished attic of Judson dormitory for occult rituals.

George Washington University
Founded in 1821, George Washington University is located in the heart of the nation's capital. In 1997, University President Stephen Joel Trachtenberg brought together student leaders from all parts of the university to support fellowship, make GW a better university, and behave in slightly frivolous ways. The secret society was named The Order of the Hippo, after a bronze statue of a hippo, also known as the River Horse (sculpture), displayed prominently in the center of campus. The Order takes its oath from a plaque located on the front of the hippo statue, which reads, "Art for wisdom, Science for joy, Politics for beauty, and a Hippo for hope." The Order has a ritual book, which is passed down from year to year and the main aim of the group is to enact Random Acts of Kindness around GW's campus to create a better environment for all students.

Georgetown University
Georgetown’s leading secret society is the Society of Jesus founded as an all-male fraternity of would-be Catholic priests at the University of Paris (the Sorbonne) in 1534.  In 1773, the Jesuits were suppressed by the Pope but in Maryland, they stayed organized secretly. In 1789, the suppressed Jesuits helped staff Georgetown College for its founder, America's first Catholic bishop, Archbishop John Carroll; who later to become Georgetown University.  The Jesuits were long hostile to college fraternities and societies that tried to form at Georgetown like at other colleges in the 19th century because they could not control them, but the hostility had waned by 1920.  One century later, Georgetown has several fraternities and sororities, independent of the university, and a few all-male, all-female, and co-ed secret societies. 

The Stewards Society (collectively referred to as The Stewards) is an anonymous, all-male service fraternity, often considered a secret society, at Georgetown University. While generally considered a secret society by the student body, the Stewards have claimed to be a predominantly alumni-built organization. The original organization was founded in 1982, eventually going public in 1988. The Stewards would continue to operate until the mid-1990s when the organization broke apart and the original group became defunct. The organization, following this schism, would form The Second and later the Third Stewards Societies, although the groups are not connected organizationally. The organization would put out public addresses in 2001 and 2020, claiming a number of service activities and defending their existence. In 2013, and 2020, the Stewards were the subject of a series of leaks, indicating that undisclosed members of the organization were part of student government. The group has been criticized for pushing a conservative agenda on campus and for its exclusion of women.

Georgia Institute of Technology
The Anak Society is the oldest known secret society and honors society at the Georgia Institute of Technology (Georgia Tech) in Atlanta, Georgia. Founded in 1908, Anak's purpose is "to honor outstanding juniors and seniors who have shown both exemplary leadership and a true love for Georgia Tech". The society's name refers to Anak, a biblical figure said to be the forefather of a race of giants.

Although not founded as a secret society, Anak has kept its activities and membership rosters confidential since 1961. Membership is made public upon a student's graduation or a faculty member's retirement. The Anak Society's membership comprises at least 1,100 Georgia Tech graduates, faculty members, and honorary members.

The society was influential in the history of Georgia Tech. Anak played a major role in establishing several of Georgia Tech's most active student organizations – including Georgia Tech's yearbook, the Blueprint; Georgia Tech's student newspaper, The Technique, and Georgia Tech's Student Government Association – as well as several lasting Georgia Tech traditions. The society also claims involvement in several civil rights projects, most notably in peacefully integrating Georgia Tech's first African-American students in 1961, preventing the Ku Klux Klan from setting up a student chapter at Georgia Tech.

Harvard University 
Harvard does not have secret societies in the usual sense, though it does have final clubs, fraternities, sororities, and a variety of other secret or semi-secret organizations.

Final clubs are secretive about their election procedures, and they have secret initiations and meetings.  However, there is little secrecy about who is a member. They are larger than secret societies generally are (approximately forty students per club). Guests are admitted under restrictions. "Punch Season" and the "Final Dinner" is analogous to "Tap" at Yale. As of the Fall of 2015, one of the all-male final clubs has gone co-ed (the Spee Club). The seven remaining all-male clubs are in the process of going co-ed or are fighting pressures to do so.

Final clubs at Harvard include The Porcellian Club (1791), originally called The Argonauts; The Delphic Club (1900); The Fly Club, (1836), a successor of Alpha Delta Phi; The Phoenix - S K Club (1895); The Owl Club, originally called Phi Delta Psi, (1896); and The Fox Club (1898).

Co-ed clubs include The Spee Club, The Aleph (formerly Alpha Epsilon Pi) (2001), and The K.S (formerly Kappa Sigma) (1905).

There are also five female clubs: The Bee Club (1991), The Isis Club (2000), The Sablière Society (2002), The Pleiades Society (2002), and La Vie Club (2008).

Harvard also has two fraternities, Sigma Chi (1992) and Sigma Alpha Epsilon (1893), and four sororities: Delta Gamma (1994), Kappa Kappa Gamma (2003), Kappa Alpha Theta (1993), and Alpha Phi (2013). These organizations are semi-secret and have secret initiation processes and meetings but a more transparent process for gaining membership. All four sororities and the Sigma Chi fraternity also have rules against admitting non-members to many parts of their buildings.

Another all-male social group is The Oak Club (2005), a successor of Delta Upsilon (1890) and later The D.U. "Duck" Club (1940), which holds events but does not own property in Harvard Square. There are also several final clubs and fraternities which are now defunct, including Pi Eta Speakers, The D.U. "Duck" Club, Delta Upsilon, Pi Kappa Alpha, and The Iroquois.

Approximately 10% of men and 5% of women are in final clubs. Approximately 7% of men and 15% of women are in Greek letter organizations. Additionally, an unknown number of students are in other secretive on-campus groups.

Other secretive social groups include the Hasty Pudding Club, Harvard Lampoon, Harvard Advocate, the Signet Society, and The Seneca.

Finally, Harvard Lodge is a university Masonic lodge, founded in 1922 by Harvard Law School Dean/Professor Roscoe Pound, members of the Harvard Square & Compass Club, and members of the Harvard Masonic Club (which included Theodore Roosevelt). It is the oldest academic lodge in North America, its membership is restricted to males with a Harvard affiliation, and it operates in the building of Grand Lodge of Massachusetts, overlooking Boston Common.

James Madison University 
Although the members remain reticent, James Madison University has only one known secret society. This society is named IN8 (pronounced /ɪˈneɪt/). The name references the college's founding in 1908 and the emblem of the organization consists of an infinity sign with an ‘I’ and ‘N’ embedded within the curve. Most notably, IN8 is known for its laud of eight students per semester who have outstanding college careers and fulfill the organization's 8 supposed core values: Loyalty, Benevolence, Service, Justice, Integrity, Intellect, Character, and Spirit. However, this is not their only known function, IN8 also provides philanthropic gifts to the university. The sundial located by the Quad, which is a famous landmark for many of the students, was donated by the group. IN8 hosts a website bearing their emblem which states “The IN8 Foundation is a benevolent charitable organization supporting the James Madison University community.”

The IN8 Foundation was mentioned in The Insider's Guide to the Colleges, 2009. Writing on student involvement at James Madison University, Insider Guides states that IN8 is “Not necessarily the most popular but one of the most famed among these [student groups] is IN8, JMU’s secret society. Every year, it gives out eight letters to students and faculty who have significantly impacted their society to let them know that their work does not go unnoticed. In addition, in 2003, they donated a human sundial, a spot in the middle of campus where a person stands on a particular month’s mark and casts a shadow on plaques six or seven feet away that designates the time.”

Johns Hopkins University 
Through the years, many secret societies, senior societies, and other groups have been founded at Johns Hopkins. Most of these societies were founded around the 1890s at the beginning of the university and played a significant role in the early development of the student body. This includes the Cane Club, The Ananias Society, The Senior Society, The Pithotomy Club, The Ubiquiteers, Tau Club, and De Gang. These historic secret societies are either defunct or non-existent.

Founded for members who value friendship and privacy to enjoy the arts together, the Blue Jay Supper Society is the only active secret society with open applications at Johns Hopkins. The Supper Society looks for brilliant misfits and creative types, and accepts applications from undergraduate and graduate students as well as alumni. Membership is capped at 150 globally.

Loyola University Maryland 
Loyola University Maryland, a Jesuit, Liberal-Arts school located in Baltimore, Maryland has had a few secret societies of notability. The Green and Grey society, named after the school’s colors, was established in 1989. The school selects “a small number of men and women from the senior class who demonstrated excellence in academic, personal, and spiritual integration and a commitment to leadership and service to Loyola. In the spirit of Jesuit ideals, the Society serves as an advisor to the University executives by identifying and communicating issues of significance. As engaged members of the community, the Society empowers students across the University to live the magis.”  While the society is acknowledged to exist, they members and overall selection process remains elusive.

Longwood University 
Secret societies have also long been part of Virginia's third-oldest public institution, which began in 1839 as an all-female seminary. One of the first of its kind, Longwood has undergone multiple changes in name and became co-educational in 1967 and transitioned from its previous name, Longwood College, to its final name, Longwood University, in 2002. Longwood currently has three secret societies, the oldest of which is CHI, founded on October 15, 1900, by members from three of Longwood's four sorority Alpha chapters-- Kappa Delta, Zeta Tau Alpha, and Sigma Sigma Sigma. The society was originally called the "Society of Societies" whose original intentions were to hold students accountable and enrich the lives of their peers and professors by calling out bad behavior, taking hooded walks called "CHI Walks" and hosting a bonfire at the end of each academic year called "CHI burning" where senior members would reveal themselves to campus. Today, CHI represents something very different and works on behalf of the college to represent the Longwood spirit—the blue and white spirit. Members make their presence known by leaving small "droppings" or tokens around campus, writing letters to Longwood students, faculty, and staff which celebrate their achievements, and the members of CHI "commend" members during their annual "CHI Burning" which remains to this day. The mark of the society can be found on the sidewalks of the campus, where their symbol (a simple geometric version of Ruffner Hall) is painted in blue. Students, faculty, and staff do not step on these symbols as a means of paying respect to the society, the Longwood spirit, and the preservation of said spirit. The physical presence of CHI can also be found on campus because the society has donated generously to many campus fundraising campaigns, and donated the CHI Fountain, located at the center of campus, which along its top stone, reads the public motto of the society.

The third-oldest and second-longest consistently operating secret society at Longwood are Princeps, which was founded in 1992 on the premise of promoting citizen leadership and academic excellence. The society is represented by the number seven, with a seven-point crown above the number, most commonly in black. The society's colors are red, gold, and black, and they often commend members of the community with letters, tokens of achievement, and other gifts. Princeps, meaning "leader" in Latin, also awards paper cutout versions of their symbol, the seven, to students who achieve both Dean's List and President's List. Those who achieve Dean's List receive a black seven and those who achieve President's List receive a red seven. Princeps also recognizes students with wooden sevens, and the senior members of the society reveal themselves on graduation morning on the front steps of Lancaster Hall, home to the President's Office, at 7:07am, where they appear from within the crowd or from the building wearing a red sash with their symbol, the 7 and crown, stitched on the sash which drapes across their body. Membership selection for this society, just like CHI, remains a secret. Princeps has no known ties to the University of Virginia 7 Society.

New York University 
Several secret societies have historically existed at New York University, including Red Dragon Society, which only takes both "distinguished" male and female seniors from the College of Arts and Science; Knights of the Lamp, which only takes seniors from the Stern School of Business; the Philomathean Society (which operated from 1832 to 1888); the Eucleian Society (from 1832 to the 1940s); and the Andiron Club. Only Red Dragon Society still exists. Edgar Allan Poe was a frequent speaker at the Philomathean Society and the Eucleian Society and lived on the Square.

In addition, NYU's first yearbook was formed by fraternities and "secret societies" at the university.

Norwich University
Secret societies are banned in all military academies in the United States. Norwich University was the last military academy to outlaw secret societies, doing so in 1998. The stated reason for doing so was controversy regarding hazing and abuse of cadets. Before the ban, Norwich was home to a handful of long-standing secret societies such as the Old Crow Society, Night Riders, and Skull and Swords. Like the other military academies, Norwich does not allow fraternities, having been banned in 1962. However, Norwich has an Alpha chapter of the Theta Chi Society now known as Theta Chi Fraternity on the basis that it is not a traditional fraternity, but admits those in pursuit of engineering degrees and thus an order to honor academic accomplishments akin to Phi Theta Kappa.

Pennsylvania State University
There are currently three well-known societies at Pennsylvania State University: Parmi Nous (1907), Lion's Paw (1908), and Skull and Bones (1912). Penn State has seen several different honorary societies with varying levels of publicity and activity. In 1907, the first "hat" society, so-named because of such organizations' emblematic headwear, Druids, was formed; similar societies expanded and included dedicated groups for women (e.g. Chimes, Scrolls) and men (e.g. Blue Key, Androcles) based on class standing and extracurricular involvement. These groups were temporarily governed by a "Hat Society Council" which was made up of representatives from each organization from 1948 to 1958. Hat societies were involved in University life passing down traditions (called "freshmen customs") for first-year students, forming honor guards for football players as they went on to the field, and recognizing leaders, scholars, and athletes in the Penn State community. The three remaining senior societies no longer operate as publicly but continue to serve the university in a variety of functions. Lion's Paw is closely associated with conservation efforts at Mount Nittany in State College, PA.

Princeton University 

Princeton's eating clubs are not fraternities, nor are they secret societies by any standard measure, but they are often seen as being tenuously analogous.

Additionally, Princeton has several genuine secret societies; perhaps the best-known is a chapter of St. Anthony Hall, otherwise known as Delta Psi, a co-ed literary society. While membership in the Princeton chapter of Delta Psi (aka St. Anthony Hall) is public, the society is known to maintain a secret president, referred to as Number One, whose identity is known only to members for the duration of his or her office. The 21 Club, an all-male drinking society, is also a notorious Princeton secret society. Princeton also has a long tradition of underground societies. While secret society membership is relatively public at some schools, Princeton's historical secret society rolls are very secretive because of Woodrow Wilson's ban on clandestine organizations and his threat to expel secret fraternity members from Princeton. One such society is Phi (pronounced fē), a society dating to 1929 when members of the Whig society splintered off after the merger of the Whig and Cliosophic debating societies. Phi's membership is secretive and difficult to discern because no more than ten active "Phis" exist at one time: Phis usually receive offers at the end of their third year. As an adaptation to Princeton's stringent anti-society rules, each active class does not meet the preceding class that selected it until the First of June (after their first Reunions and before graduation). 1.6... is the Golden Ratio, hence the name Phi. Another society is the exclusively female Foxtail Society, founded in 1974 soon after Princeton began admitting women in 1969. The society was founded in response to the lack of eating clubs open to women. While admittance numbers have changed over the years, Foxtail selects anywhere from 10 to 15 women to become members at the end of their junior year.

Rutgers University 
As eighth oldest of the colleges in the United States, Rutgers University has had several secret societies on campus. One of which, a likely hoax, claims to be established in 1834. Students associated with these societies were allegedly involved in the Rutgers-Princeton Cannon War in 1876. At the turn of the 20th century, Rutgers had developed two full sets of class year societies based on the Yale model, down to the freshman societies such as the Chain and Bones and Serpent and Coffin. The senior class societies at Rutgers included the Brotherhood of the Golden Dagger (1898–1940), Casque and Dagger (1901), and Cap and Skull (1900). Cap and Skull was dissolved in the 1960s after complaints of elitism. In 1982 the name was revived for the university-sanctioned senior-year honor society.

Smith College 
Founded in 1871, Smith College opened in 1875 as an institution dedicated to the education of women. Similarly to other colleges and universities, Smith also had secret societies from the 1890s until the 1960s. Two of these societies, the Orangemen and the Ancient Order of Hibernians (A.O.H.) were both founded in 1890 according to the Smith College Special Collections. In 1948, the President of the College, Herbert John Davis outlawed secret societies because he believed they were “undemocratic.” The A.O.H. and the Orangemen carried out a rivalry throughout their existence at the college.

The A.O.H. was a parody of the Irish Roman Catholic fraternal order by the same name, the Ancient Order of Hibernians, which dates back to 1500s Ireland. The Orangemen also was a parody of the Loyal Orange Association, a Protestant Irish organization, which dates back to 1795 Ireland. The A.O.H. of Smith College did write to the A.O.H. for “recognition,” but were turned down.

The A.O.H’s color was green and the Orangemen’s was orange. The Orangemen wore cloaks with orange hoods and also had orange hats in which they paraded around campus. The A.O.H. also had activities including giving out special names to new members. According to Smith College Special Collections, both organizations limited membership to 12 people from each class year. The A.O.H. held initiations for new members in the fall of their first year of college. The Orangemen also held initiations.

Secret societies were outlawed at Smith College in 1948 making the groups stop “all official activities.” But, Smith College Special Collections says, “records indicate that both organizations continued unofficially until the mid-1960s” with available documentation ceasing during the 1965-1966 academic year.

University of California, Berkeley 
The University of California, Berkeley is home to a small handful of secret societies. Skull & Keys, founded in 1892 by Frank Norris, is the earliest secret society at Berkeley and is composed of a select few members from certain fraternity chapters on campus.

The second oldest is the Sigma Phi Society of the Thorsen House (popularly shortened to Thorsen), founded in 1912, which acts independent of all of Berkeley's fraternal traditions and regulations and has resided in the famous Thorsen House since 1942.

The campus is also home to the Order of the Golden Bear, established in 1900, which discourages the term "secret society" despite operating with a secret membership. The order is composed of undergraduate and graduate students, alumni, faculty, and administrators with a commitment to the betterment of the university. Its significance and recognition are considerably smaller now than in its earliest years.

University of Chicago
The University of Chicago has never had a substantial number of active secret societies; indeed, shortly after the university's founding, the faculty of the university released a resolution suggesting that the exclusionary structure of many such societies made them antithetical to the democratic spirit of the university. Nevertheless, one notable exception - The Society of the Owl and Serpent, a secret honors society founded in 1896 - was active for over 70 years. The Society voted to officially disband in 1968 as a sign of its "counterculture" values, electing to donate its office space to the student radio group WHPK and use its remaining funds for the purchase of an FM transmitter.

Notable alumni of the Society of the Owl and Serpent include former Supreme Court Justice John Paul Stevens, who graduated from the university in 1941.

University of Cincinnati
The University of Cincinnati hosts several secret societies, locally referred to as honoraries. The first such organization is Sigma Sigma, founded in 1898 and is open to upperclassmen men on campus. Sigma Sigma is responsible for the Sigma Sigma commons on the UC campus, along with other donations to the campus. Cincinnatus (co-ed) was founded in 1917 with the Men of METRO founded in 1946. CWEST and Sigma Phi exist as the female counterparts to Men of METRO and Sigma Sigma, respectively. Many of the university's prominent alumni claim membership in one or many of these organizations.

Each organization coordinates at least one annual event: Men of Metro and CWEST host an annual Talent Show, Cincinnatus a charitable run, Sigma Phi the Homecoming dance, and Sigma Sigma an annual carnival.

University of Georgia
A group unique to the University of Georgia is the men's secret society known as the Order of the Greek Horsemen which annually inducts five fraternity men, all leaders of the Greek Fraternity system.

Likewise, the highest achievement a male can attain at the university is claimed by the Gridiron Secret Society.

Palladia Secret Society was founded in the early 1960s as the highest honor a woman can attain at the University of Georgia. Palladia inducts approximately 12 women each fall and has an extensive network of alumni, including administrators at the University of Georgia and prominent female leaders across the state.

The Panhellenic sororities also have a secret society known as Trust of the Pearl, which inducts five accomplished sorority women each spring.  The Sphinx Club is the oldest honorary society at the University of Georgia, recognizing students, faculty, staff, and alumni who have made significant contributions to the university, the State of Georgia, and the nation. Membership in this organization is not secret; however, all business and happenings of the organization are.

University of Miami
Iron Arrow Honor Society, founded in 1926 in conjunction with the University of Miami's opening, is the highest honor attained at the University of Miami. Based on Seminole Indian tradition, Iron Arrow recognizes those individuals in the University of Miami community who exemplify the five qualities of Iron Arrow: Scholarship, Leadership, Character, Humility, and Love of Alma Mater.

University of Michigan
The University of Michigan Ann Arbor hosts three secret societies: Order of Angell, Phoenix, and the Vulcan Senior Engineering Society. Order of Angell and Phoenix were once under the umbrella group "The Tower Society", the name referring to their location at the top of the Michigan Union tower. Michigauma (Order of Angell) was all-male while Adara (Phoenix) was all-female.

Order of Angell, known as "Order", is an evolved version of a previous society Michigauma. It was inspired by the rituals and culture of the Native Americans of the United States. Since its creation in 1902, the group is credited with creating Dance Marathon, one of the largest charitable events at the University of Michigan, and the construction of the Michigan Union for which it was granted permanent space on the top floors of the tower which they refer to as the "tomb". In 2007 the group changed its name to Order of Angell and later, in 2021, the group officially disbanded.

Phoenix, (formerly known as Adara) holding to astrological roots, was formed in the late 1970s by the women leaders on campus. In the early 1980s, they joined the tower society and occupied the sixth floor of the tower just below Michigamua. Phoenix, alongside Order, is now co-ed. Phoenix was disbanded in March 2021 via a vote of an overwhelming majority.

Vulcan Senior Engineering Society, known as "the Vulcans", occupied the fifth floor of the Union tower though were not formally a part of the tower society. They draw their heritage from the Roman god Vulcan. The group which used to do its tapping publicly is known for its long black robes and its financial contributions to the University of Michigan College of Engineering.

University of Missouri 
In 1895, the Alpha Theta Chapter of the Theta Nu Epsilon sophomore society was founded under the guidance of faculty member Luther DeFoe. DeFoe also served as a mentor to the founding members of the QEBH senior men's society, which was founded in 1898. Mystical Seven was founded in 1907 and has become the second best-known society on campus. Some have suggested that Missouri's Mystical Seven was modeled after Virginia's Seven Society, which had been established just a couple of years earlier. Other secret societies followed, including Society of the Hidden Eye for junior, and senior men, LSV for senior women, Thadstek for freshman, and sophomore men, Tomb and Key for freshman, and sophomore men, and Kappa Kappa whose membership composition was unknown. During this period of rapid expansion of secret societies, a network of sub-rosa inter-fraternity organizations also established itself on campus with no purpose other than socializing and mischief-making. This network, known commonly as the "Greek Underworld" included organizations such as Seven Equals, Kappa Beta Phi, Sigma Phi Sigma, Kappa Nu Theta, and Sigma Alpha Beta.

It is currently home to at least six secret honor societies that still participate in an annual public Taies Day ceremony at the end of each spring semester. QEBH, Mystical Seven, LSV, Alpha Xi chapter of Omicron Delta Kappa, Friars chapter of Mortar Board, and Rollins Society each use the Tap Day ceremony at the conclusion of the year to reveal the members who were initiated over the past year. Missouri is one of the few remaining institutions in which the local Omicron Delta Kappa and Mortar Board chapters carry out much of their work in secrecy. The Jefferson Society, which attempted to take part in Tap Day and was denied, claims to have been around since 1862. In addition to Tap Day activities, several of the societies maintain a public presence during some athletic events. QEBH is the caretaker of the Victory Bell, along with Nebraska's Society of Innocents, awarded to the winner of the Missouri–Nebraska Rivalry football game each year. The Friars Chapter of Mortar Board exchanges a gavel with Nebraska (The Black Masque Chapter of Mortar Board) at each MU-UNL football game, symbolizing the rivalry between the Universities. Mystical Seven and Oklahoma's Pe-et Society were likewise entrusted with the Peace Pipe trophy that was awarded to the winner of the biennial Missouri-Oklahoma football match. Omicron Delta Kappa previously served as the caretaker of the Indian War Drum trophy awarded to the winner of the annual Border War football game between Missouri and Kansas.

University of North Carolina at Chapel Hill

The library at the University of North Carolina at Chapel Hill contains the archives of the Order of Gimghoul, a secret society headquartered at the Gimghoul Castle. The order was founded in 1889 by Robert Worth Bingham, Shepard Bryan, William W. Davies, Edward Wray Martin, and Andrew Henry Patterson, who were students at the time.

The society is open to male students (rising juniors and higher), and faculty members by invitation. The society centers itself around the legend of Peter Dromgoole, a student who mysteriously disappeared from the UNC campus in 1833. The founders originally called themselves the Order of Dromgoole, but later changed it to the Order of Gimghoul to be, "in accord with midnight and graves and weirdness", according to the university's archives.

Tradition has it that the order upheld the "Dromgoole legend and the ideals of Arthurian knighthood and chivalry". From all accounts, the order is social and has no clandestine agenda. Membership is closed and information about the order is strictly confidential, as is access to archives that are less than 50 years old.

The Order of the Gorgon's Head, another secret society at the University of North Carolina at Chapel Hill, was founded in 1896 by Darius Eatman, Edward Kidder Graham, Ralph Henry Graves, Samuel Selden Lamb, Richard Henry Lewis, Jr., and Percy DePonceau Whitaker. Membership has always been limited to male members of the junior, senior, professional, and post-graduate classes along with male faculty members. Inductees may not be members of other societies. Officers include Princeps (chief officer), Quaestor, and Scriptor. The purpose of the Order is to promote friendship, goodwill, and social fellowship among its members. The Order of the Gorgon's Head was one of two "junior orders" established at the university in the 1890s. The two orders had written agreements that they would not attempt to recruit freshmen or sophomores. Each order had a lodge (the Gimghouls later built a castle), where members gathered for meetings and events. Each had secret rituals based on myths. Those of the Order of the Gorgon's Head centered on the myth of the Gorgons, three monstrous sisters prominent in ancient Greek and Roman lore.

The university's library also contains the archives of the Dialectic and Philanthropic Societies. The Societies were founded in 1795 by some of the first students to attend the university, and are the oldest public school societies in the nation. While at first maintaining strict secrecy in their proceedings, the Societies' meetings are now generally open to the public; however, the Societies reserve the right at all times to call an "Executive Session", at which point all non-members are escorted from the chambers. All undergraduates may attempt to join one of the two societies by petitioning, upon a vote by current Society members.

Most recently, in 2011, The Daily Tar Heel reported the first of two donations to campus entities by a secret society named Infinity. In 2011, the society gifted $888.88 to the Eve Carson Scholarship fund, which honors the late Student Body President Eve Carson.  In 2012, the society gifted $888.88 to the Student Enrichment Fund, a student-created fund allowing students to apply for grants to attend off-campus events such as speeches, conferences or other academic or extracurricular opportunities. The significance of the digit '8' comes from the symbol for infinity that resembles an eight on its side.

University of Pennsylvania
At Penn, secret societies are smaller than their Greek counterparts and tend to vary in degree of secrecy. There are three senior honorary societies. The Sphinx Senior Society and the Friars Senior Society were both founded at the turn of the 20th century, while The Mortar Board Senior Society was founded in 1922. None of these societies was intended to be secret, in that their undergraduate and alumni membership were and continue to be publicly known, they share many of the characteristics of undergraduate secret societies of the time; they tap a diverse group of campus leaders to become members during their senior year, organize social and service activities throughout the year, and maintain an extensive network of successful and notable alumni. Alumni of Friars, for example, include Harold Ford Jr. and Ed Rendell; the Sphinx alumni roster boasts Richard A. Clarke and John Legend. In addition, there are several other groups called "secret societies". These groups generally denote a social club that is independent of any official organization. For this reason, the society is not regulated by the university and is not accountable to a national organization.

University of Southern California
The University of Southern California is home to the Skull and Dagger Society. Founded in 1913, Skull and Dagger is USC's oldest honor society. The Society inducts Trojans who have demonstrated extraordinary leadership on campus or who have brought fame and notoriety to the university. In the early 20th century, the Society published its members' names and accomplishments. In recent years, it has kept its members' identities secret. Members often include student body presidents, Daily Trojan editors in chief, All-American athletes, football team captains, and inter-fraternity council presidents. Little is known about the rituals and practices of the society aside from once a year when the society pranks the school, drops a banner from the Student Union Building, and runs through campus wearing odd hats and tailcoats. Recently, the society has been criticized for its annual prank practice, with opponents saying the pranks "damage the trustworthiness and credibility of respected campus services". Although originally an all-male society, Skull and Dagger now admits women. Skull and Dagger has been known to make gifts to the university. In 1994, the Society donated "The Wall of Scholars" to honor students who have won national and international fellowships, as well as recipients of USC awards. In 2011, the Society embarked to restore the university's class marker tradition and has been donating class markers ever since. Skull and Dagger has additionally endowed two scholarships, which are awarded annually to students "who have demonstrated significant campus and/or community leadership".

University of Texas
The University of Texas at Austin is home to the Friar Society. The Friar Society was founded in 1911 by Curtice Rosser and Marion Levy. Eight members were initially selected for the charter group. Originally, four men were chosen from the junior and senior classes every year based on a significant contribution to The University of Texas. The Friar Society recognizes students who have made a significant contribution to The University of Texas. In 1936, the Friars decided to start taking larger classes to accommodate the growing size of the university. Women were first admitted to the Friar Society on March 25, 1973. In 1982, the Friars decided to create a teaching fellowship in honor of the upcoming centennial celebration for The University of Texas. Friar alumni raised $100,000 for this purpose, and this amount was matched by the Board of Regents to create an endowment. The Friar Centennial Teaching Fellowship is an annual award given to a UT professor who has demonstrated excellence at the undergraduate teaching level. With a prize of $25,000, the award is the largest monetary award annually given to a UT professor.

The University of Texas at Austin is also home to the Tejas Club, an all-male secret society founded in 1925 that is one of the oldest student organizations on campus. The three pillars of Tejas are scholarship, leadership, and friendship, representing a desire to attract and mold male student leaders on campus. Prominent members of the Tejas Club include former U.S. Secretary of State Rex Tillerson, CarMax founder Austin Ligon, and numerous Austin-area leaders. The membership process is secretive and closed to the public.

University of South Carolina
The Clariosophic Society, also known as ΜΣΦ (Mu Sigma Phi), is a literary society founded in 1806 at the University of South Carolina, then known as South Carolina College. It was formed after the splitting of the Philomathic Society, which had been formed within weeks of the opening of the college in 1805 and included virtually all students. At the Synapian Convention in February 1806, the members of Philomathic voted to split into two societies, Clariosophic and Euphradian. Two blood brothers picked the members for the new groups like choosing sides for an impromptu baseball game. John Goodwin became the first president of Clariosophic. Other early presidents include Stephen Elliott, Hugh S. Legaré, George McDuffie, and Richard I. Manning. The Society was reactivated in 2013 and became co-ed. The membership process and society roster are secretive and closed to the public. Members are identified by a key insignia on their diplomas.

University of Virginia 

Secret societies have been a part of University of Virginia student life since the founding of the Eli Banana society in 1878. Early secret societies, such as Eli Banana and T.I.L.K.A., had secret initiations but public membership; some, such as the Hot Feet, now the IMP Society, were very public, incurring the wrath of the administration for public reveals.

The first truly "secret society" was the Seven Society, founded circa 1905. Two decades before, there had been a chapter of the Mystical 7 society at Virginia, which may have been an inspiration. Nothing is known about the Seven Society except for their philanthropy to the university; members are revealed at their death. A few other societies flourished around the turn of the 20th century, such as the Z Society (formerly Zeta), which were founded in 1892, the IMP Society, reformulated in 1913 after the Hot Feet were banned in 1908, and Eli Banana, are still active at the university today. The Thirteen Society was founded on February 13, 1889. After an unknown period of inactivity, they reemerged in 2004. Currently, The Thirteen Society operates as a mainly honorary society for those who demonstrate "unselfish service to the University and excellence in their respective fields of activity."

New societies have periodically appeared at the university during the 20th century. The most notable is the P.U.M.P.K.I.N. Society, a secret group that rewards contributions to the university and which was founded before 1970; and the Society of the Purple Shadows, founded 1963, who are only seen in public in purple robes and hoods and who seek to "safeguard vigilantly the University traditions". The A.N.G.E.L.S. Society started sometime in the late 1900s is known to place white roses and letters on doors of those mourning, needing encouragement, or showing "kind behavior" to others. They are known to promote a stronger community of kindness throughout the university, completing many acts of service for students and faculty. Many of the secret societies listed contribute to the university either financially or through awards or some other form of recognition of excellence at the university.

University of Washington 
The University of Washington in Seattle, Washington is known for one secret society, the Oval Club.

Founded in 1907, the Oval Club was founded to "promote student unity and cooperation, develop cultural leaders and preserve traditions of the University of Washington". Records for Oval Club meetings have been kept by the University of Washington Library's Special Collection dating up to 1963, and membership is publicly acknowledged for Oval Club.

Washington and Lee University
Washington and Lee University in Lexington, Virginia, has two secret societies: the Sigma Society and the Cadaver Society.

Founded in 1880, the Sigma Society is one of Washington and Lee's "oldest, continuous social organizations". While membership information is not necessarily anonymous, the group's purpose and inner workings remain a secret. The group has long had a connection to President George Washington, though the extent of that relationship is unknown to the public at large. Similarly, the acronym P.A.M.O.L.A. R.Y.E.—which is inscribed on buildings and in classrooms throughout the Lexington area—also bears an unknown significance to the group. The group has largely gone underground since 1994 when University officials tore down the Sigma cabin and paid the Sigmas $15,000. Associate Justice to the Supreme Court Lewis Powell, Jr. is one of the group's most prominent members.

The membership and organizational structure of the Cadaver Society are largely unknown. Cadaver has been in continuous operation since its founding in 1957. The Cadavers have a bridge that bears their name, connecting the main campus to Wilson Field, as well as their symbol in many prominent places throughout the campus. Cadavers are known for donating large sums of money to the university and for upholding the school’s historic values. They have been criticized for their secrecy and many of their activities include running around dressed in all black and masks late at night as well as drawing their symbol all over campus. They have been known to run through the Sorority houses, talking in high voices and attempting to wake everyone in the houses up.

Washington University in St. Louis 
Three known secret societies operate at Washington University in St. Louis: ThurtenE, Lock & Chain, and Chimes. Instead of "secret societies", they are called Honoraries because of the public nature of their members and their purposes within the community.

ThurtenE was formed in 1904 as a secret society of junior men chosen for their leadership, character, and participation in campus activities. Not much is known about the founding of the group or its selection process from the early years other than the fact that only the members themselves knew who belonged to ThurtenE and membership varied from 4 to 14, before finally settling on a consistent 13. Members made themselves known at the end of their senior year during graduation by wearing a small skull pin and having the number “13” listed next to their names in Washington University's yearbook "The Hatchet". In recent years, the 13 new members are revealed when pieces of paper listing the names and the honorary's symbol are posted around campus. ThurtenE found its purpose in 1935 when it was approached by the Chancellor to rescue the floundering student circus from the senior honorary, which had merged with another group. Since 1935, ThurtenE has held the Thurtene Carnival, which is the largest and oldest student-run Carnival in the nation. The society has been co-ed since 1991.

Lock & Chain was created in 1904 by six sophomore men. Since then, the honorary has expanded to 15 members from different backgrounds. Students are chosen during the spring from the freshman class based on academic merit, extracurricular involvement, leadership capabilities and roles, and personal qualities through an application and interview process. New members can be seen spotted around campus wearing chains across their chests. Lock & Chain sponsors various events throughout the year and does community engagement and philanthropic programming.

Chapter of Chimes Junior Honorary, founded in 1948 as a women's group, is a group of juniors who share values of scholarship, leadership, and service. Each class works together for one year on programming for Wash U's campus, the internal Chapter, and the chosen partner philanthropy, with the freedom to follow their path for the year. Each member has a name assigned to them that represents an aspect of what they bring to the Honorary (such as intrepidity or flair). Their main campus program is Chimes Week, which explores a particular theme. Like ThurtenE, Chimes has been co-ed since 1991.

Yale University

The term "secret society" at Yale University encompasses organizations with many shared but not identical characteristics. The oldest surviving undergraduate secret societies at Yale parallel various 19th-century fraternal organizations.

In the traditional Yale system, societies were organized by class year. There were two, (then three), senior societies, three junior societies, two sophomore societies, and two freshman societies. All the societies were independent, all had their traditions, and each class-year pair or trio shared common traits appropriate to their class year; the freshmen societies were rambunctious and owned little real property, the sophomore and junior ones were progressively more elaborate, (the sophomore ones regularly maintained live theater in their halls), and the senior ones were extremely small and elite, and with quite expensive property and celebrations.

Each of the societies had a link in the class year before and after it; that is, members of one freshman society would all get elected to the same sophomore society year after year, and so on, so that there were two or three parallel sets of linked societies. From time to time, there would be a coup, and one society would break the pattern, forcing the other societies to likewise change election strategies, or cause the creation of a new society. Delta Kappa Epsilon, a junior society, was created in reaction to a botched election process to the junior class societies in 1844.

This process held from the 1840s to the 1910s. This system kept Yale out of the more typical intercollegiate college fraternity system, although some regular college fraternities were created out of the Yale system. Yale-type class societies also extended across northeastern colleges. This system has not survived the introduction of regular fraternities and other changes. The senior-class societies continue to prosper today without any of the lower-class societies. A similar system was introduced at Wesleyan University in nearby Middletown, Connecticut, but with a pair of societies in each class year and dual memberships between class societies and college fraternities, so that most class society members were also fraternity members. The older societies survived because of their endowments, real estate, and the vigor of their respective alumni organizations and their charitable Trusts.

In the past century, the size of Yale has allowed for a wider variety of student societies, including regular college fraternity chapters, and other models, so it can be challenging to categorize the organizations. And there are societies like Sage and Chalice, Brothers in Unity, and St. Anthony Hall which cross ordinary categories.

There are typical attributes of the Yale societies. They are often restricted by class year, especially the senior class. They usually have fifteen members per class year. They "tap" their members, mostly on the same "Tap Night", and a member is off-limits to recruitment by another secret society, (i.e. reciprocal exclusivity). The normal pattern now is that a group of secret societies places an advertisement in the Yale Daily News in early spring that informs students when Tap Night is taking place and when students should expect to receive formal offers (usually one week before official Tap Night). Tap Night is typically held on a Thursday in mid-April; the most recently held Tap Night was on April 10, 2014.

During 1854–1956, "'Sheff, the Sheffield Scientific School was the sciences and engineering college of Yale University, and it also had a fraternal culture that differed in some respects from the humanities campus.

Many societies have owned meeting halls, with different accommodations. Following the example of Skull & Bones, the halls are often referred to as 'tombs'. A series of articles on Dartmouth and Yale secret-society architecture provides an overview of the buildings. Societies that own tombs or halls are sometimes known as 'landed' societies. The four oldest landed societies are Skull and Bones (1832), Scroll and Key (1841), Spade and Grave (1864), and Wolf's Head (1883). The surviving landed Sheffield societies are Berzelius (1848), Book and Snake (1863), St. Elmo (1889), and the Aurelian Honor Society (1910). St. Anthony Hall (1867) calls itself a "final society". Three newer societies that own property include Elihu (1903) – whose building is the oldest of the senior society buildings at Yale – Manuscript Society (1952), and Mace and Chain (1956). Yale's Buildings and Grounds Department lists the societies with halls in its online architectural database.

List of North American collegiate secret societies

See also
 High school secret societies
 International Debutante Ball
 Secret societies

Notes

References

Bibliography

External links
 "How the Secret Societies Got That Way", Yale Alumni Magazine (September 2004)
 "Halls, Tombs and Houses: Student Society Architecture at Dartmouth"
 "Four Years at Yale" A late 19th-century contemporary account of fraternal societies at two Connecticut Universities: Yale & Wesleyan (courtesy of Google Books)
 The Peter Dromgoole legend

North America
Student societies in the United States
Collegiate secret societies